4644 may refer to:

 4-6-4-4, a Whyte notation classification of steam locomotive
 4644 Oumu, a minor planet